Kate Harbour is an English voice actress who provides many voices for the television series Bob the Builder, including Wendy, Dizzy, Mrs. Potts, Mrs. Broadbent, Mrs. Percival, and Pilchard.

Biography
She is the daughter of actor Michael N. Harbour, whose appearances included Heartbeat, Casualty, Doctors, Dixon of Dock Green and Midsomer Murders.

Career
She also provided the voice of Lyca in Lavender Castle, as well as Anita Knight and Doctor Doctor in The Secret Show. Her other roles include Oakie Doke, Shaun the Sheep, Fimbles, Boo! (as Laughing Duck), PB Bear and Friends, The Magic Key, Yoko! Jakamoko! Toto!, Enid Blyton's Enchanted Lands (The Magic of the Faraway Tree), Nick & Perry and Brambly Hedge.

She also supplied voices for the popular CBeebies children's series Timmy Time. She also voiced the third Enemy Keeper in the video game Dungeon Keeper 2. She has also provided voices for many commercials and audiobooks.

Filmography

Film

Television

Video games

References

External links
 

Living people
20th-century English actresses
21st-century English actresses
English video game actresses
English voice actresses
Year of birth missing (living people)